Hermannsdalstinden is the highest mountain on the island of Moskenesøya. It is located in the Lofoten archipelago in the municipality of Moskenes in Nordland county, Norway. There's a cabin, Munkebu Hut, that is used as an overnight base camp for summiting Hermannsdalstinden. The hike from Munkebu Hut to the Hermannsdalstinden summit takes about six to eight hours round trip.

References

Mountains of Nordland
Moskenes

External links 
 Hiking trail description for Hermannsdalstinden